Canseco may refer to:

Canseco (surname)
The Cansecos, Canadian electronic band

See also
Conseco, Inc., an American insurance company now known as CNO Financial Group
Diez Canseco, Peruvian surname
San Martín de los Cansecos